The  of the Imperial Japanese Army Air Force was formed on January 30, 1945, as the 113 Educational Flight Corps. On March 30 of the same year the unit gained its final name, the 72nd Shinbu Squadron.

On May 25, 1945, the 72nd Shinbu Squadron departed from Metabaru Air Field to the secret air base at Bansei, which is now part of the city of Minamisatsuma (南さつま市) in Kagoshima Prefecture, located on the southwestern tip of Kyūshū. Two Type 99 assault planes of the 72nd Shinbu Squadron damaged American destroyer USS Braine, on which 66 men  were killed and 78 wounded. Following the attacks the twelve men from the Squadron left for Korea to wait for orders.

Notes

See also
  Yukio Araki (1928-1945)
  Bansei Tokkō Peace Museum
  Kamikaze

Aerial operations and battles of World War II
Kamikaze
Military units and formations of Japan in World War II
Military units and formations established in 1945
Japanese World War II special forces
Units and formations of the Imperial Japanese Army Air Service
Military units and formations disestablished in 1945